John J. Howard (born March 1, 1983) is an American professional mixed martial artist currently competing in the Middleweight division of the Eagle Fighting Championship. A professional competitor since 2004, Howard has formerly competed for the International Fight League, the Ultimate Fighting Championship, CES MMA, the Cage Fury Fighting Championships and Professional Fighters League. .

Background
Howard was born and raised by his single mother along with his brother in the Dorchester neighborhood of Boston, Massachusetts where he still resides to this day. Howard got into fights often while growing up. In high school, Howard played football and basketball and learned the electrical trade after getting his high school degree. He found martial arts after going to a Job Corps to get his high school diploma where he learned grappling from a freestyle grappler. Later on in his career he has become well known for his wrestling skills and takedowns in MMA despite not having any background in it . After graduating, Howard began training at a local gym. Howard's nickname "Doomsday" is from the infamous villain who killed Superman. Howard once sparred against Tamerlan Tsarnaev, a boxer, when the two trained at Wai Kru Mixed Martial Arts in Boston.

Mixed martial arts career

Ultimate Fighting Championship
Howard made his UFC debut on January 31, 2009, against Chris Wilson at UFC 94, winning via split decision.

He then faced Tamdan McCrory at UFC 101. This fight was significant for both as the two had become friends fighting on promotions in the Northeast. Howard won the fight via split decision.

Howard fought Dennis Hallman on December 5, 2009, at The Ultimate Fighter 10 Finale. After getting out-grappled for most of the fight, Howard knocked out Hallman at 4:55 of the third round.

Howard was expected to face Anthony Johnson on March 21, 2010, at UFC Live: Vera vs. Jones, but Johnson sustained an injury during training. UFC newcomer Daniel Roberts stepped in to be Howard's new opponent. Howard defeated Roberts via first-round KO.

Howard was defeated by Jake Ellenberger via third round TKO due to doctor stoppage at UFC Live: Jones vs. Matyushenko. Though Howard had success on the feet, he was unable to defend the takedowns of Ellenberger. Ellenberger would go on to cause Howard's left eye to close after repeatedly landing short elbows and punches from the guard leading to the stoppage,

Howard next faced former title challenger Thiago Alves on December 11, 2010, at UFC 124. He lost the fight via unanimous decision.

Howard was expected to face Martin Kampmann on June 26, 2011, at UFC on Versus 4 However, Kampmann was forced out of the bout with an injury and replaced by Matt Brown. Howard was defeated by Brown after three tough rounds via unanimous decision (29-28, 29–28, 29–28). After the loss to Brown, Howard was released from the promotion.

Classic Entertainment and Sports (CES MMA)
Howard made his CES debut at CES MMA: Never Surrender against Todd Chattelle for the CES Middleweight Championship. He won via TKO in the second round.

Howard made his first title defense against Scott Rehm. He won via TKO.

Howard's next title defense was against Brett Chism. He won via TKO.

Howard's next title defense was at CES MMA: Path to Destruction, against Jason Louck. He won via KO just 23 seconds into the first round.

Howard defended his title for the fourth time against Chris Woodall. He won via KO in the first round.

Return to the UFC
Following the Boston Marathon bombing, Howard openly stated that he would like to be on the UFC Fight Night 26 card in Boston, Massachusetts in August 2013 to show support for his hometown. On July 17, 2013, it was announced that he would appear on the card, replacing Josh Samman in a Middleweight bout against Uriah Hall. He defeated Hall via split decision.

Howard returned to Welterweight and faced Siyar Bahadurzada on December 28, 2013, at UFC 168. He won the fight via unanimous decision.

Howard faced Ryan LaFlare at UFC Fight Night 39. He lost the fight by unanimous decision.

Howard was then expected to face Rick Story at UFC Fight Night 45 on July 16, 2014. However, he was forced from the bout due to injury and was replaced by returning veteran Leonardo Mafra.

Howard faced Brian Ebersole on September 27, 2014, at UFC 178. He lost the fight via split decision.

Howard faced Lorenz Larkin on January 18, 2015, at UFC Fight Night 59. He lost the fight via TKO in the first round.

Howard was expected to face Brandon Thatch on July 11, 2015, at UFC 189. However, on June 23, Thatch was pulled from that bout in favor of a fight with Gunnar Nelson as his scheduled opponent John Hathaway was forced out with injury. Howard faced Cathal Pendred at the event. Howard won the fight via split decision.

Howard faced Tim Means on December 10, 2015, at UFC Fight Night 80. He lost the fight via knockout in the second round.

World Series of Fighting
On March 8, 2016, it was announced that Howard had signed with the World Series of Fighting promotion.

Howard faced Abubakar Nurmagomedov on October 7, 2016, at WSOF33. He lost the fight via unanimous decision.

On July 11, 2019 at PFL 4, he faced Ray Cooper III, winning the bout after knocking him out in the first round.

Independent promotions 
Howard faced Tyler Ray at XMMA 3 on October 23, 2021. He lost the fight via unanimous decision.

Howard faced Ramazan Kuramagomedov at Eagle FC 44, on January 28, 2022. He lost the bout via unanimous decision.

Howard faced Ange Loosa on April 2, 2022, at XMMA 4. He lost the bout via unanimous decision.

Personal life
Howard has three daughters, one with one woman and two with another; the girls live with their mothers. Before fighting professionally, Howard worked as an electrician. He is also a diehard New England Patriots fan, and is a fan of all of the professional teams out of Boston including the Boston Red Sox, the Boston Celtics, and the Boston Bruins. He also enjoys playing video games in his free time. In 2016, after undergoing a series of non-invasive neurological tests, Howard was diagnosed as having autism spectrum disorder at the age of 33. Referring to this diagnosis, Howard said "Now a lot of stuff in my life makes sense. Now I'm thinking about my life, it makes sense why I do certain things. Even to this day."

Championships and accomplishments

Mixed martial arts
Ultimate Fighting Championship
Fight of the Night (One time)
Knockout of the Night (One time)
Ring of Combat
ROC Welterweight Championship (One time)
CES MMA
CES Middleweight Championship (One time)

Mixed martial arts record

|-
|Loss
|align=center|29–19–1
| Ange Loosa
|Decision (unanimous)
| XMMA 4: Black Magic
| 
|align=center|3
|align=center|5:00
| New Orleans, Louisiana, United States
|
|-
|Loss
|align=center|29–18–1
|Ramazan Kuramagomedov
|Decision (unanimous)
|Eagle FC 44
|
|align=center|3
|align=center|5:00
|Miami, Florida, United States
|
|-
|Loss
|align=center|29–17–1
|Tyler Ray
|Decision (unanimous)
|XMMA 3: Vice City
|
|align=center|3
|align=center|5:00
|Miami, Florida, United States
|
|-
|Won
|align=center|29–16–1
|Ozzie Alvarez
|Decision (unanimous)
|CES MMA 63: Howard vs Alvarez
|
|align=center|3
|align=center|5:00
|Springfield, Massachusetts, United States
|
|-
|Loss
|align=center|28–16–1
|David Michaud
|Decision (unanimous)
|PFL 7
|
|align=center|3
|align=center|5:00
|Las Vegas, Nevada, United States
|.
|-
| Win
| align=center| 28–15–1
| Ray Cooper III
| KO (punches)
| PFL 4
| 
| align=center| 1 
| align=center| 3:23
| Atlantic City, New Jersey
| 
|-
| Loss
| align=center| 27–15–1
| Magomed Magomedkerimov	
| Submission (guillotine choke)
| PFL 1
| 
| align=center| 1 
| align=center| 4:54
| Uniondale, New York
| 
|-
|Draw
|align=center| 27–14–1
|Louis Taylor
|Technical Draw (illegal knee)
| rowspan=2 |PFL 10
| rowspan=2 |
|align=center|2
|align=center|4:55
| rowspan=2 |Washington, D.C., United States
|
|-
|Win
|align=center| 27–14
|Eddie Gordon
|Decision (unanimous)
|align=center|2
|align=center|5:00
|
|-
|Loss
|align=center| 26–14
|Bruno Santos
|Decision (unanimous)
|PFL 6
|
|align=center|3
|align=center|5:00
|Atlantic City, New Jersey, United States
|
|-
| Win
| align=center| 26–13
| Gasan Umalatov
| Submission (rear-naked choke)
| PFL 3
| 
| align=center| 2
| align=center| 2:59
| Washington D.C., United States
|
|-
|Win
|align=center|25–13
|Roger Carroll
|Decision (unanimous)
|CES MMA 46: Howard vs. Carroll
|
|align=center|3
|align=center|5:00
|Lincoln, Rhode Island, United States
|
|-
|Loss
|align=center|24–13
|Abubakar Nurmagomedov
|Decision (unanimous)
|WSOF 33
|
|align=center|3
|align=center|5:00
|Kansas City, Missouri, United States
|Welterweight bout.
|-
|Win
|align=center|24–12
|Michael Arrant
|Decision (unanimous)
|WSOF 31
|
|align=center|3
|align=center|5:00
|Mashantucket, Connecticut, United States
|Return to Middleweight.
|-
|Loss
|align=center|23–12
|Tim Means
|KO (punch)
|UFC Fight Night: Namajunas vs. VanZant
|
|align=center|2
|align=center|0:21
|Las Vegas, Nevada, United States
|
|-
|Win
|align=center|23–11
|Cathal Pendred
|Decision (split)
|UFC 189
|
|align=center|3
|align=center|5:00
|Las Vegas, Nevada, United States
|
|-
|Loss
|align=center|22–11
| Lorenz Larkin
|TKO (punches)
| UFC Fight Night: McGregor vs. Siver
| 
|align=center|1
|align=center|2:17
| Boston, Massachusetts, United States
|
|-
|Loss
|align=center|22–10
| Brian Ebersole
|Decision (split)
| UFC 178
| 
|align=center|3
|align=center|5:00
| Las Vegas, Nevada, United States
|
|-
|Loss
|align=center|22–9
| Ryan LaFlare
| Decision (unanimous)
| UFC Fight Night: Nogueira vs. Nelson
| 
| align=center| 3
| align=center| 5:00
| Abu Dhabi, United Arab Emirates
|
|-
|Win
|align=center|22–8
| Siyar Bahadurzada
| Decision (unanimous)
| UFC 168
| 
|align=center|3
|align=center|5:00
| Las Vegas, Nevada, United States
|
|-
|Win
|align=center|21–8
| Uriah Hall
|Decision (split)
|UFC Fight Night: Shogun vs. Sonnen
|
|align=center|3
|align=center|5:00
|Boston, Massachusetts, United States
|
|-
|Win
|align=center|20–8
| Chris Woodall
|TKO (punches)
|CES MMA: New Blood
|
|align=center|1
|align=center|2:14
|Lincoln, Rhode Island, United States
|
|-
|Win
|align=center|19–8
| Jason Louck
|KO (punches)
|CES MMA: Path to Destruction
|
|align=center|1
|align=center|0:23
|Lincoln, Rhode Island, United States
|
|-
|Loss
|align=center|18–8
| Leandro Batata
|Decision (unanimous)
|HFR 2: High Fight Rock 2
|
|align=center|3
|align=center|5:00
|Goiânia, Brazil
|
|-
|Win
|align=center|18–7
| Brett Chism
|TKO (punches)
|CES MMA: Real Pain
|
|align=center|2
|align=center|3:31
|Lincoln, Rhode Island, United States
|
|-
|Win
|align=center|17–7
| Scott Rehm
|TKO (arm injury)
|CES MMA: Far Beyond Driven
|
|align=center|1
|align=center|1:28
|Lincoln, Rhode Island, United States
|
|-
|Win
|align=center|16–7
| Todd Chattelle
|TKO (punches)
|CES MMA: Never Surrender
|
|align=center|2
|align=center|4:42
|Lincoln, Rhode Island, United States
|
|-
|Win
|align=center|15–7
| Dennis Olson
|Decision (unanimous)
|CFA 3
|
|align=center|3
|align=center|5:00
|Miami, Florida, United States
|
|-
|Loss
|align=center|14–7
| Matt Brown
|Decision (unanimous)
|UFC Live: Kongo vs. Barry
|
|align=center|3
|align=center|5:00
|Pittsburgh, Pennsylvania, United States
|
|-
|Loss
|align=center|14–6
| Thiago Alves
|Decision (unanimous)
|UFC 124
|
|align=center|3
|align=center|5:00
|Montreal, Quebec, Canada
|
|-
|Loss
|align=center|14–5
| Jake Ellenberger
|TKO (doctor stoppage)
|UFC Live: Jones vs. Matyushenko
|
|align=center|3
|align=center|2:21
|San Diego, California, United States
|
|-
|Win
|align=center|14–4
| Daniel Roberts
|KO (punches)
|UFC Live: Vera vs. Jones
|
|align=center|1
|align=center|2:01
|Broomfield, Colorado, United States
|
|-
|Win
|align=center|13–4
| Dennis Hallman
|KO (punches)
|The Ultimate Fighter: Heavyweights Finale
|
|align=center|3
|align=center|4:55
|Las Vegas, Nevada, United States
|
|-
|Win
|align=center|12–4
| Tamdan McCrory
|Decision (split)
|UFC 101
|
|align=center|3
|align=center|5:00
|Philadelphia, Pennsylvania, United States
|
|-
|Win
|align=center|11–4
| Chris Wilson
|Decision (split)
|UFC 94
|
|align=center|3
|align=center|5:00
|Las Vegas, Nevada, United States
|
|-
|Win
|align=center|10–4
| Charlie Brenneman
|Decision (unanimous)
|Ring of Combat 21
|
|align=center|3
|align=center|5:00
|Atlantic City, New Jersey, United States
|
|-
|Win
|align=center|9–4
| Nick Calandrino
|TKO (punches)
|IFL: Connecticut
|
|align=center|3
|align=center|2:24
|Uncasville, Connecticut, United States
|
|-
|Win
|align=center|8–4
| Jose Rodriguez
|KO (punches)
|Ring of Combat 18
|
|align=center|1
|align=center|4:07
|Atlantic City, New Jersey, United States
|
|-
|Loss
|align=center|7–4
| Dan Miller
|Decision (unanimous)
|Ring of Combat 17
|
|align=center|3
|align=center|5:00
|Atlantic City, New Jersey, United States
|Middleweight bout.
|-
|Loss
|align=center|7–3
| Woody Weatherby
|TKO (punches)
|WFL 19
|
|align=center|1
|align=center|2:32
|Revere, Massachusetts, United States
|Welterweight debut; for vacant WFL Welterweight Championship.
|-
|Win
|align=center|7–2
| Mandela K'ponou
|Submission (armbar)
|CZ 23
|
|align=center|1
|align=center|N/A
|Revere, Massachusetts, United States
|
|-
|Loss
|align=center|6–2
| Nick Catone
|Decision (unanimous)
|CFFC 5
|
|align=center|3
|align=center|N/A
|Atlantic City, New Jersey, United States
|
|-
|Win
|align=center|6–1
| Josh Rosaaen
|Submission (triangle choke)
|CFFC 4
|
|align=center|3
|align=center|1:17
|Atlantic City, New Jersey, United States
|
|-
|Loss
|align=center|5–1
| Alexandre Moreno
|Submission (armbar)
|WFL 10
|
|align=center|1
|align=center|N/A
|Revere, Massachusetts, United States
|
|-
|Win
|align=center|5–0
| Jason Dublin
|Submission (arm-triangle choke)
|CZ 15
|
|align=center|2
|align=center|2:39
|Revere, Massachusetts, United States
|Won vacant CZ Welterweight Championship.
|-
|Win
|align=center|4–0
| Aldo Santos
|Submission (armbar)
|WFL 4
|
|align=center|1
|align=center|3:41
|Revere, Massachusetts, United States
|
|-
|Win
|align=center|3–0
| Mandela K'ponou
|Submission (heel hook)
|WFL 1
|
|align=center|2
|align=center|2:52
|Revere, Massachusetts, United States
|
|-
|Win
|align=center|2–0
| Les Richardson
|Submission (rear-naked choke)
|CZ 9
|
|align=center|2
|align=center|2:53
|Revere, Massachusetts, United States
|
|-
|Win
|align=center|1–0
| Jason Dublin
|Decision (unanimous)
|CZ 8
|
|align=center|2
|align=center|5:00
|Revere, Massachusetts, United States
|
|-

See also
 List of current WSOF fighters
 List of male mixed martial artists

References

External links
 
 
Official John Howard Tee KO Merch

American male mixed martial artists
Mixed martial artists from Massachusetts
Welterweight mixed martial artists
Mixed martial artists utilizing Muay Thai
Mixed martial artists utilizing Brazilian jiu-jitsu
African-American mixed martial artists
American practitioners of Brazilian jiu-jitsu
People awarded a black belt in Brazilian jiu-jitsu
American Muay Thai practitioners
1983 births
Living people
Sportspeople from Boston
People from Dorchester, Massachusetts
Sportspeople with autism
Ultimate Fighting Championship male fighters
21st-century African-American sportspeople
20th-century African-American people